Aron Mkungilwa (born May 3, 1996) is a Canadian soccer player who plays as a defender.

Career

Professional

FC Montreal
After spending four years with the Montreal Impact Academy, Mkungilwa signed a professional contract with USL affiliate club FC Montreal for the last half of the 2015 season.  He made his professional debut on August 5, 2015 in a 4–0 victory over Louisville City FC.

Ottawa Fury
After 2 seasons with FC Montreal, Mkungilwa signed the Impact's new affiliate club, Ottawa Fury FC, in February 2017.

International
In 2013, Mkungilwa made one appearance for the Canadian U17 national team in the 2013 CONCACAF U-17 Championship.  He was named to the squad for the 2013 FIFA U-17 World Cup.  However, on October 17, he was ruled out after suffering an injury during pre-tournament camp.

References

External links
USSF Development Academy bio

1996 births
Living people
Association football defenders
Canadian soccer players
Soccer people from Quebec
Canada men's youth international soccer players
Montreal Impact U23 players
FC Montreal players
Ottawa Fury FC players
Canadian Soccer League (1998–present) players
USL Championship players
Canadian people of Democratic Republic of the Congo descent